Martin Vyskočil (born 15 September 1982) is a Czech footballer who plays as a forward.

Club career
Vyskočil was signed by Spartak Trnava in July 2011 and  made his league debut for them against Dunajská Streda on 17 July 2011.

Honours
Žilina

Slovak Super Liga (1): 2010
Slovak Super Cup (1): 2010

References

External links

1982 births
Living people
Sportspeople from Olomouc
Association football wingers
Czech footballers
Czech Republic youth international footballers
Czech Republic under-21 international footballers
Czech First League players
SK Sigma Olomouc players
SK Dynamo České Budějovice players
FC Fastav Zlín players
Slovak Super Liga players
ŠK Slovan Bratislava players
MŠK Žilina players
1. FC Tatran Prešov players
FC Spartak Trnava players
Expatriate footballers in Slovakia
Czech expatriate footballers
Czech expatriate sportspeople in Slovakia
Association football forwards
FK Frýdek-Místek players